Rik Verbrugghe (born 23 July 1974) is a Belgian former professional road racing cyclist.

Verbrugghe was born in Tienen, Flemish Brabant. In 1996, he turned professional, and he has since become a Belgian time trial champion, competed in the 2000 Summer Olympics, won a stage at the Tour de France, three stages at the Giro d'Italia, and the one-day Ardennes classics–La Flèche Wallonne, and the overall and two stages of the Critérium International. In 2008 he announced his retirement, and subsequent role as team director at Quick Step during the 2009 and 2010 seasons. In 2011 he became team director at BMC Racing Team.

Teams and major results 

1996 – Lotto-Isoglass
1997 – Lotto-Mobistar
1998 – Lotto-Mobistar
1999 – Lotto-Mobistar
 2nd, Clásica de San Sebastián
2000 – Lotto-Adecco
 1st  Belgian National Time Trial Championships
 2nd, La Flèche Wallonne
2001 – Lotto-Adecco
 La Flèche Wallonne
 Overall, Critérium International
 Stage 1
 Stage 3
 Stage 15 – Tour de France
 Prologue – Giro d'Italia
 Criterium Peer
 Criterium Maastricht
2002 – Lotto-Adecco
 Stage 7 – Giro d'Italia
 9th, Overall – Giro d'Italia
 Prologue – Tour de Romandie
2003 – Lotto-Domo
 3rd, Overall – Paris-Corrèze
2004 – Lotto-Domo
 5th, Overall – Tour of Belgium
2005 – Quick Step-Davitamon
 Prologue –Eneco Tour, 5 days in leader's red jersey
 Grand Prix de Lugano
2006 – Cofidis
 Stage 7 – Giro d'Italia

External links

1974 births
Living people
People from Tienen
Belgian male cyclists
Olympic cyclists of Belgium
Cyclists at the 2000 Summer Olympics
Belgian Tour de France stage winners
Belgian Giro d'Italia stage winners
Cyclists from Flemish Brabant